= Wirtsberg =

Mountain in Germany

Coordinates: 50°16′00″N 12°20′15″E

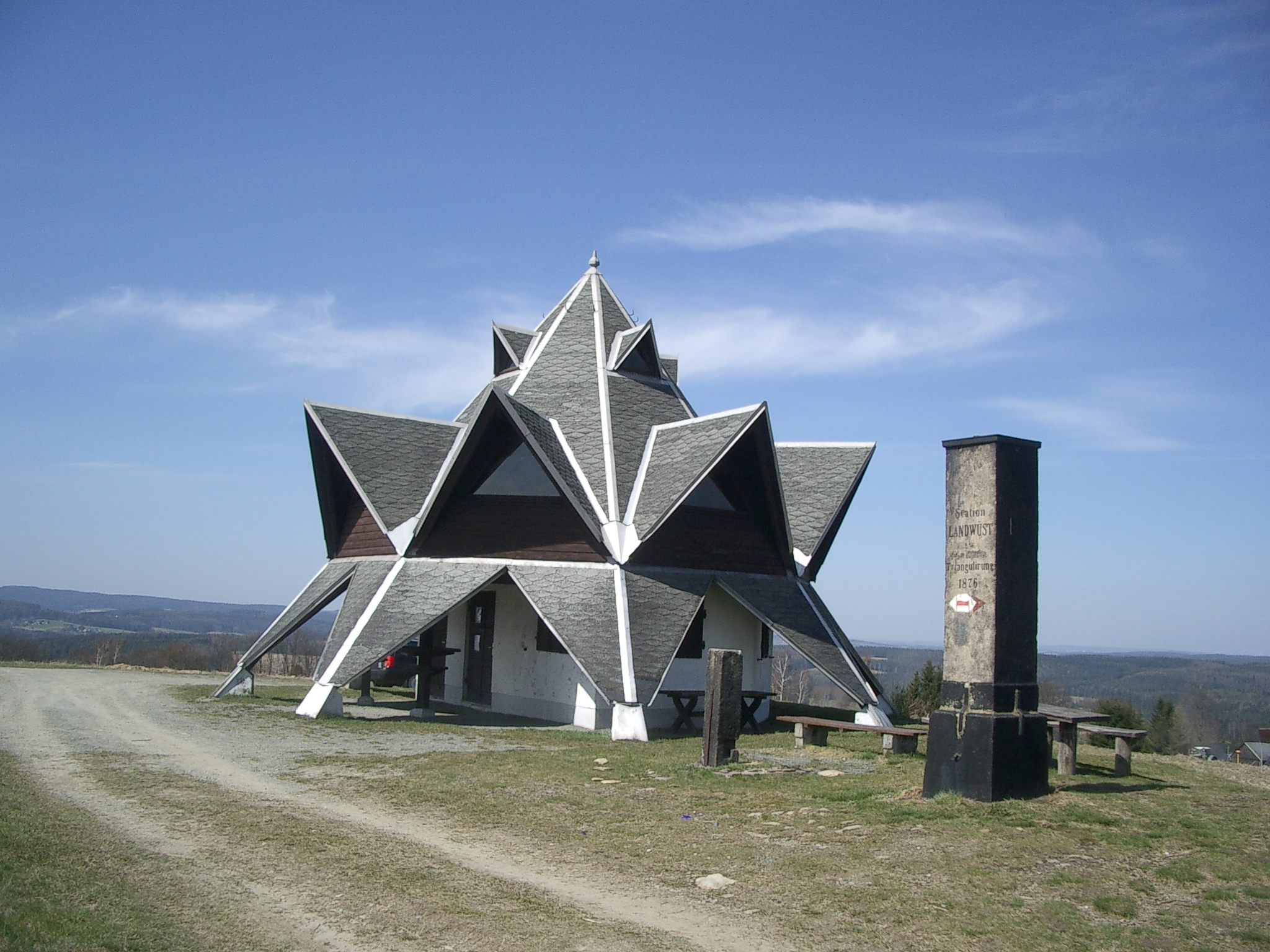
- Watchtower on the Wirtsberg near Landwüst.

Highest point
- Elevation: 664 m (2,178 ft)

Geography
- Location: Saxony, Germany

Wirtsberg is a mountain of Saxony, southeastern Germany.
